The Baker Plan was launched in October 1985 at the International Monetary Fund/World Bank meeting in Seoul, by James Baker, United States Secretary of the Treasury, as a way to combat the international debt crisis.

It was inspired by the idea that China's trade surplus could be used to relieve some of the Third World's problems with debt. The Plan was designed to help highly indebted middle-income countries, i.e., those countries that are not incredibly poor but nevertheless owe a large amount of money. Fifteen countries were mentioned, and ten of those were in Central and Latin America. 

The Baker Plan was succeeded by the Brady Plan.

References
Buiter, W. and Srinivasan, T.N. (1987) "Rewarding the Profligate and Punishing the Prudent and Poor: Some Recent Proposals for Debt Relief", World Development Journal, Vol. 15, No. 3, pp411–417.
Bogdanowicz-Bindert, C A, (1986) "The Debt Crisis: The Baker Plan Revisited", Journal of Interamerican Studies and World Affairs, Vol. 28, No. 3, pp. 33–45.
Rudolph, Barbara, "Enter The Brady Plan", Time, 20 March 1989.
Riding, Alan, "Baker's debt plan gets Latin scrutiny", New York Times, December 16, 1985.

Economic history of the United States
History of the foreign relations of the United States
1985 in international relations